Major-General Ian Stuart Baxter  (20 July 1937 – 17 October 2017) was a British Army officer who played a crucial role in organising at short notice the logistics for the British forces in the Falklands War for which he was appointed a CBE.

References

1937 births
2017 deaths
People from Bermondsey
Antiques dealers
British Army major generals
British Army personnel of the Falklands War
Commanders of the Order of the British Empire
Royal Army Service Corps officers
Royal Corps of Transport officers